William Jewell (1789-1852) was a politician, physician, ordained minister, and educator from Columbia, Missouri and namesake of William Jewell College in Liberty, Missouri. He served as Columbia's second mayor.

Life
Dr. Jewell graduated with a degree in medicine from Transylvania University. He moved to Columbia MO and built a combination home, office, and hospital at the northwest corner of Sixth Street and Broadway. The site is now the location of a branch of Commerce Bank of Columbia. Jewell's two-story structure was the only hospital in Columbia at the time it was built.  Dr. Jewell held political office as mayor of Columbia and later as a state legislator.

As mayor of Columbia, Jewell initiated the surveying and paving of the city's streets. He also improved sanitation standards in the early town. Later, as state legislator, Jewell worked for reforms such as abolishing the whipping post and pillory and for establishing a public hospital in St. Louis.

Though William Jewell had a full life of public service, he was also quite influential in Baptist life in Missouri. William Jewell was perhaps the leading force behind organizing the First Baptist Church in Columbia and its most influential member for almost forty years.  He was buried in Columbia's Jewell Cemetery. Inside Jewell Cemetery, William Jewell's tombstone has a memorable epitaph: "His work is done, he did it well and faithfully."

Educational Advocacy 
Dr. Jewell was known for his involvement with education. He was one of three men who accepted applications for enrollment to the University of Missouri, which was established in 1839. He was a member of the board of trustees in 1833 when Columbia Female College, predecessor to Stephens College was founded.  He supported a bill to establish the location of the state university in Columbia and chaired a committee to raise subscriptions for the university, giving $1,800 himself.

In founding the college that bears his name, he initially wanted the Baptist school to be in Boonville, Missouri.  However, after Alexander William Doniphan argued that the offer of a larger parcel of undeveloped land in Liberty, Missouri was worth more than the developed land in Boonville, the Liberty site was chosen and Jewell donated $10,000 to start school in 1849. He was appointed by the college's Board to supervise the construction of the first building in 1850. Later that year, during the exceptionally hot summer, Dr. Jewell while working on the building site got heat stroke and died a few days later. The building was also named after him, Jewell Hall, and was completed in 1858, at a cost of about $44,000.

References

William Jewell College history
The Partee Collection:  An Archive of Missouri Baptist History
Centennial History of Missouri: (the Center State) One Hundred Years in the Union, 1820-1921 By Walter Barlow StevensCentennial History of Missouri: (the Center State) One Hundred Years in the Union, 1820-1921 By Walter Barlow Stevens - S.J. Clarke Publishing - 1921 - pp30-33
William Jewell, M.D. 1789–1852, Address to the Boone County Bicentennial by O. Edwyn Luttrell

External links
 
 

Mayors of Columbia, Missouri
1789 births
1852 deaths
William Jewell College
Missouri Whigs
19th-century American politicians
Burials at Jewell Cemetery (Columbia, Missouri)
Religion in Columbia, Missouri